Anthony J. Barbieri (born August 26, 1963, in Framingham, Massachusetts) is an American comedic writer and performer. He is known for his appearances as the Jimmy Kimmel Live! character "Jake Byrd."

Career
Barbieri was the writer of the monthly satirical Monroe comic strip for Mad Magazine from 1997 to 2010.

In 1999, he got his first writer's credit for television while working on The Man Show. Barbieri went on to write for the sitcoms That's My Bush! and That '80s Show.

The Big Three
Barbieri was part of a comedy team known as "The Big Three" with Perry Caravello and Don Barris. In 2003, the trio starred in the Comedy Central reality movie Windy City Heat, directed by Bobcat Goldthwait and written by Barris and Barbieri, and Jimmy Kimmel. The movie was an elaborate prank on Caravello who was under the impression he had landed his first starring role in a major motion picture.

In 2010, Caravello, Barris and Barbieri started a weekly comedy podcast called The Big 3 Podcast, on Adam Carolla's ACE Broadcasting Network. In 2011 the show moved to Barris' own network, before ending in April 2015.

Jimmy Kimmel Live!
Barbieri began writing for Jimmy Kimmel Live! in 2003, and in 2004 started appearing on the show as the character Jake Byrd. Byrd is portrayed as a good-natured man obsessed with celebrities, and his bits involve him satirizing excessive media attention to celebrity spectacles such as the Michael Jackson trial or the arrest of Paris Hilton. Byrd usually interacts with the fans while they are being interviewed by the media or inserts himself into press conferences.  He has successfully fooled major media outlets into thinking he is a real person, including The New York Times, who quoted him in a May 1, 2004 article about the Michael Jackson trial, before running a redact five days later noting that he was a character. Despite this, the Times wrote again about him, as if he were a real person, during the 2007 O. J. Simpson robbery case.

In 2008 Barbieri won the Primetime Emmy Award for Outstanding Original Music and Lyrics for the Jimmy Kimmel Live! song "I'm F**king Matt Damon". He was nominated for another Emmy in 2013 as part of Kimmel's writing staff for Outstanding Writing for a Variety Series.

Filmography
The following list includes shows or films in which he has a small, but credited, role as a writer or actor.
 Rick and Morty (2015) – (TV program) – (Voice Actor)
 Windy City Heat (2003) – (TV movie) – (Writer/Actor)
 Jimmy Kimmel Live! (2003–) (Talk show on ABC) – (Writer/Actor) – His own pieces, including his well-known character Jake Byrd.
 That '80s Show (2002) (TV program) – (Writer)
 Crank Yankers (2002–present) (TV program) (Writer/Voice Actor)
 That's My Bush! (2001) (TV program) – (Writer/Actor) – A political comedy spoofing George W. Bush (Appeared in one episode).
 The Man Show (1999–2004) (TV program) – (Writer)
 Delta Force: Land Warrior (2000) (Video game) (Voice Actor)
 Pledge Night (1988) (movie) – Horror film.

References

External links
 
 Paris Hilton News conference, with Jake Byrd reference
 Picture of Jake Byrd appearing in Santa Barbara News-Press
 Santa Barbara News-Press story on the Jake Byrd hoax
 Radar Magazine quoting Jake Byrd
 New York Times Article mentioning Jake Byrd along with a correction regarding his actual identity
 Complete list of Barbieri's articles for MAD Magazine

1963 births
Living people
American male screenwriters
American television writers
American comics writers
American satirists
American parodists
People from Framingham, Massachusetts
American male television writers
Mad (magazine) people
Screenwriters from Massachusetts
American writers of Italian descent